Davide Luppi (born 19 July 1990) is an Italian footballer who plays as a midfielder or forward for  club Piacenza on loan from Torres.

Career
Born in Trescore Balneario, Lombardy, Luppi started his career at Emilian club Bologna. Luppi was a member of Bologna U17 team for 2006–07 national student league (Allievi).

Sassuolo
After a season for Bologna reserve in national "spring" reserve league, in August 2008 he left for Sassuolo along with Lorenzo Simonini. In July 2009 Luppi signed his first fully professional contract with Sassuolo and left for Manfredonia in co-ownership deal. Sassuolo also farmed Luppi to Viareggio also in co-ownership deal in July 2010, for a peppercorn of €500. In June 2011 Sassuolo bought back Luppi again for €10,000 and re-signed a 2-year deal.

On 17 August 2011 Luppi was loaned to Portogruaro with option to buy.

Corregesse & Modena

In summer 2014 Luppi was signed by Modena. He was assigned number 10 shirt. On 2 February 2015 Luppi left for Pro Vercelli on a temporary deal.

Verona
On 7 July 2016 Luppi was signed by Verona.

Entella
On 8 August 2017 Luppi joined Virtus Entella on a temporary deal, with an obligation to buy at the end of season.

Viterbese
On 1 February 2019 he moved to Viterbese.

Cittadella
On 20 August 2019, he signed with Cittadella.

Serie C
On 29 October 2020 he joined Legnago. On 1 February 2021, he returned to Modena. On 27 August 2021, Luppi was sold to Feralpisalò. On 22 August 2022, Luppi signed for Torres. On 19 January 2023, Luppi was loaned to Piacenza.

References

External links
 AIC Profile (data by football.it) 
 
 

1990 births
Living people
People from Trescore Balneario
Sportspeople from the Province of Bergamo
Footballers from Lombardy
Italian footballers
Association football midfielders
Serie B players
Serie C players
Bologna F.C. 1909 players
U.S. Sassuolo Calcio players
Manfredonia Calcio players
F.C. Esperia Viareggio players
A.S.D. Portogruaro players
S.S.D. Correggese Calcio 1948 players
Modena F.C. players
F.C. Pro Vercelli 1892 players
Hellas Verona F.C. players
Virtus Entella players
U.S. Viterbese 1908 players
A.S. Cittadella players
F.C. Legnago Salus players
Modena F.C. 2018 players
FeralpiSalò players
S.E.F. Torres 1903 players
Piacenza Calcio 1919 players